"Vergiß Es (Forget It)" is a single from Matthias Reim's 2004 compilation "Déjà Vu", with guest vocals from Bonnie Tyler. The song is bilingual, with lyrics in German and English. The single was a major hit in Ukraine and a minor hit in Germany.

Lyrics, promotion and performances

Reim and Tyler recorded two versions of the song; one in German and English, and the other completely in English.

In the German/English version, the song has two choruses, once in German and then in English. The first chorus (right) is sung in English at the end. In the English version, the German chorus is translated.

Reim and Tyler were interviewed in 2004 in conjunction with the release of the single. Tyler stated that she had performed in festivals alongside Reim and thought that due to a similar German fan base, the single would be successful and a good idea to record. They also performed the single on several German TV shows.

On 4 and 5 June 2010 Tyler supported Reim in concerts in Eberswalde and Kamenz, Germany. They performed "Vergiß Es (Forget It)" live.

CD single
A CD single was released in Germany, also available for digital download.

Charts

Personnel
Producer – Matthias Reim
Co-producer – André Franke
Mixing – Berne Staub (from Avalon Studio, Zürich) (track 1, 2 and 3). Gary Jones (Ibiza Music Factory) (track 4)
Recording studios – Stuart Emerson Music, Kobalt Music, Warner Chappell (tracks 1, 2 and 3). Polygram Songs (track 4)

References

Bonnie Tyler songs
2004 singles
Songs written by Joachim Horn-Bernges
2004 songs
EMI Records singles